is a passenger railway station located in the town of Kyōtamba, Funai District, Kyoto Prefecture, Japan, operated by West Japan Railway Company (JR West).

Lines

Station layout
The station consists of one ground-level side platform and one ground-level island platform connected to the station building by a footbridge. The station is staffed.

Platforms

History
Wachi Station opened on August 25, 1910. With the privatization of the Japan National Railways (JNR) on April 1, 1987, the station came under the aegis of the West Japan Railway Company.

Passenger statistics
In fiscal 2016, the station was used by an average of 338 passengers daily.

Surrounding area
 Kyotamba Town Hall Wachi Branch (formerly Wachi Town Hall)
 Kyotanba Town Wachi Elementary School
 Kyoto Prefectural College of Forestry
 Yura River
 Japan National Route 27

See also
List of railway stations in Japan

External links

 Station Official Site

Railway stations in Kyoto Prefecture
Sanin Main Line
Railway stations in Japan opened in 1910
Kyōtamba, Kyoto